The Breeze: An Appreciation of JJ Cale is a collaborative studio album featuring Eric Clapton and a host of other musicians. It consists of covers of songs by J. J. Cale, who had died the previous year. It was named after Cale's 1972 single "Call Me the Breeze". It was produced by Clapton and Simon Climie. The guests invited on the album include Tom Petty, Mark Knopfler, Willie Nelson and John Mayer.

Track listing

All songs written by J.J. Cale except where indicated

Personnel

Artists

Eric Clapton – vocals (tracks 1, 2, 4, 6-11, 13, 15 & 16), guitars (all tracks), dobro (track 11)
Tom Petty – vocals (tracks 2, 8 & 12)
Mark Knopfler – guitar (tracks 3 & 13), vocals (tracks 3 & 13)
John Mayer – guitar (tracks 4, 7 & 15), vocals (tracks 4 & 7)
Willie Nelson – guitar (tracks 9 & 14), vocals (tracks 9 & 14)
Don White – guitar (tracks 3, 5 & 13), vocals (tracks 5, 11 & 13)
Reggie Young – guitar (tracks 2, 6 & 8)
Derek Trucks – guitar (tracks 14 & 16)
Albert Lee – guitar (tracks 1 & 11)
David Lindley – guitar (tracks 9 & 16)
Don Preston – guitar (tracks 3 & 13)
Christine Lakeland – guitar (track 3), vocals (track 16)
Mike Campbell – guitar
Doyle Bramhall II – guitar (track 10)

Greg Leisz – pedal steel guitar (tracks 12 & 14)
Nathan East – bass
Simon Climie – Wurlitzer electric piano, Hammond organ, piano, drum programming, percussion, backing vocals (track 9)
Walt Richmond – Wurlitzer electric piano, Hammond organ, piano
Jimmy Markham – harmonica (track 13)
Mickey Raphael – harmonica (tracks 3, 9 & 14)
Michelle John – backing vocals (tracks 4, 5, 9 & 13)
Sharon White – backing vocals (tracks 4, 5, 9 & 13)
Jim Keltner – drums
James Cruce – drums
Jim Karstein – drums
David Teegarden – drums
Satnam Ramgotra – tablas

Production
Producers – Eric Clapton and Simon Climie
Additional Production on tracks 9 & 14 – Buddy Cannon
Recorded by Alan Douglas 
Additional Engineering – Tony Castle, Bobby Tis and Ryan Ulyate.
Assistant Engineers – Jacob Dennis, Joe Kearns, Tim Marchiafava, Derek Parnell and Wendy Seidman.
Mixed by Simon Climie
Mastered by Bob Ludwig at Gateway Mastering (Portland, ME).
Session Coordinator – Debbie Johnson
Art Direction and Design – Catherine Roylance
Cover Image – Michael Putland
Cover Illustration – Yoshiyuki Sadamoto
Press Management – Kristen Foster

Chart performance

Weekly Charts

Year-end charts

Certifications and sales

References

Eric Clapton albums
2014 albums
Tribute albums
Surfdog Records albums